The women's marathon event at the 2007 Pan American Games was held on July 22.

Results

References
Official results

Marathon
2007
2007 in women's athletics
Panamerican
2007
2007 Panamerican Games